The Yakovlev Yak-7 was developed from the earlier Yak-1 fighter, initially as a trainer but converted into a fighter. As both a fighter and later reverting to its original training role, the Yak-7 proved to be a capable aircraft and was well liked by air crews. The Yak-7 was simpler, tougher and generally better than the Yak-1.

Design and development
In 1939, Alexander Yakovlev designed a tandem-seat advanced trainer, originally designated "I-27" and then "UTI-26", offered along with the original I-26 proposal that became the Yak-1. The "UTI" (Uchebno Trenirovochnyi Istrebitel, translated as: Training Fighter) was intended to give pilots-in-training experience on a high-performance aircraft before transitioning to a fighter. With development work started in 1940, the UTI-26 differed from its predecessor in its larger span wing being placed farther back for balance as well as having two cockpits with dual controls and a rudimentary communication system. It was armed with a single  ShKAS machine gun in the cowling, mainly for use in training, but Yakovlev envisioned a multi-purpose aircraft that could also undertake courier and light transport duties at the front.

The first production aircraft known as Yak-7UTIs retained a retractable main landing gear, but beginning in the summer of 1941, a fixed landing gear variant, the Yak-7V (Vyvozoni for Familiarization) was substituted. The factory reasoned that production would be simplified and that reduced performance would not be detrimental for a trainer. Yak-7UTIs and Yak-7Vs were also equipped with skis for winter operations.

A factory team from N° 301, headed by K.A. Sinelshchikov, was detached from the Yakovlev OKB to supervise production of Yak-7UTI. One of these aircraft (serial number 04-11) was fitted with an armored backrest plate over the rear position, self-sealing fuel tanks which filled with inert gas as they emptied, three "RO" rocket launchers under each wing for as many RS-82 rockets, an axial motornaya pushka-mount  ShVAK cannon firing through the propeller spinner, with 120 rounds, and two 7.62 mm ShKAS machine guns under the cowling, each with 750 rounds. The rear cockpit position was retained, allowing it to accommodate a second seat (without controls) for fast courier and transport duties or a fuel tank for extended range. The additional space could also house bombs or other gear. The engine was an M-105P and the model was designated Yak-7/M-105P.

Sinelshchikov did not inform Yakovlev about the conversion and when he learned about it, Yakovlev remained sceptical of the need for the changes. After brief factory trials, the aircraft turned out to be better than the single-seat Yak-1, thanks to the modifications already applied to the UTI as well as a revised undercarriage with bigger tires and wheels, more efficient brakes and revised elevators, among other changes. Yakovlev submitted the Yak-7 to the authorities who approved it immediately. The firing tests at the scientific trials Polygon for aircraft armament (NIPAV) were a success and the armament was found to have no effect on the flight characteristics or the general performances of the new fighter. The aircraft's stability as a firing platform was judged far better than that of the Yak-1, the Lavochkin-Gorbunov-Gudkov LaGG-3 and Mikoyan-Gurevich MiG-3.

The GKO and the NKAP issued decrees in August 1941 for the Yak-7 to be produced by Factories N° 301 and N° 153, but Factory N° 301 had to be evacuated to Novosibirsk where it merged with N° 153. So, just 62 aircraft were produced in 1941: 51 in September–October by Factory N° 301 and 11 by N° 153 in December. Test pilot A.N. Lazarev noted the good flight characteristics, how easy it was to get out of a spin, and how well it behaved when diving: characteristics that he considered safer than those of the Yak-1. But the Yak-7 showed some defects: the M-105P engine piping, the landing gear locking system, the tires and the tail wheel were identified. The Yak-7 was introduced into the production line and the first batch of 60 reached operational squadrons by the end of 1941.

Another important variant was the Yak-7/M-105PA. On this model, the two ShKAS on the cowling had been replaced by two  UBS machine guns with 400 rounds (260 for the left and 160 for the right). It was powered by an M-105PA engine with an axial ShVAK cannon with 120 rounds. Oil and glycol radiators had been widened and refined and slightly tilted downward. The insulation of the airframe was improved, the tail wheel was totally retractable; joints and skin were more carefully made; the panels on the engine cowling fitted better; the propeller reduction gear worked better; an electro-pneumatic reloading system was installed; the canopy frame was reinforced. The Yak-7B made 27 tests flights in January and February 1942. The reports noted that while the aircraft "was not inferior to the LaGG-3 and MiG-3 and to foreign fighters in service in the USSR", it was more stable and had better flight characteristics. Subsequently, the GKO authorised production at Factory N° 153 in place of the Yak-7A, from April 1942 and 261 machines were built until July. After 20 May, the aircraft were equipped with a  tank behind the pilot's seat, but the pilots that used the Yak-7 on Stalingrad and on the Kuban removed it as it was not protected and affected the flight characteristics. Generally, the Yak-7B pleased its pilots. They reported that it was easy to fly at all altitudes, stable and easy to maintain and although it did not climb as quickly as a Messerschmitt Bf 109, it was as manoeuvrable and fast, except in the vertical plane. But defects were also noted: there was too much drag from the radiators, the canopy glass was of bad quality; the pilot was not protected enough, taking-off and landing distances were too long and, above all, it was underpowered.

Yakovlev suggested to Klimov, the engine builder, some modifications that resulted in the M-105PF which was  more powerful. But because the rear tank was removed, its range was reduced and the center of gravity was moved too far forward, while M-105 defects (glycol and oil overheating, oil leaks etc.) persisted.

Among the engine and armament options was the Yak-7-37 fitted with a  MPSh-37 cannon, (MPSh - motornaya pushka Shpital'novo - engine mounted Shpital'nyy cannon), mounted between the engine cylinder blocks, firing through the propeller spinner.

Operational history
The Yak-7 proved to be an effective close support fighter although the first two-seaters were considered nose-heavy, consequently, the factory introduced a rear cockpit fuel tank. Pilots complained about the fuel tank's vulnerability since it was unarmored, and it was usually removed in the field. There were constant changes to the design based on combat observations including a definitive single-seat variant, the Yak-7B, which was produced in large numbers.

After the war, some Yak-7V trainers were provided to the Poles and a single Yak-7V was delivered to the Hungarians for familiarization with the Yak-9 fighter.

After trials in April–May 1942, a small batch of 22 Yak-7-37s was authorised, all of which were issued to the 42nd Fighter Aviation Regiment (IAP) at the North-Western front, where they proved highly successful both in air-to-air combat and ground attack.

Variants

Ya-27 two-seat prototype converted from a pre-serial I-26
Yak-7UTI initial two-seat communication/trainer version, 186 built in 1941
Yak-7V (vyvoznoy) two-seat trainer; 510 built in 1942/43 + 87 converted from Yak-7B
Yak-7 single-seat fighter version, based on the Yak-7UTI, armor + more guns added, small number built 1941/42
Yak-7-37After trials in April–May 1942, a small batch of 22 Yak-7-37s was authorised, fitted with a MPSh-37  cannon, (MPSh - motornaya pushka Shpital'novo - engine mounted Shpital'nyy cannon), mounted between the engine cylinder blocks, firing through the propeller spinner. Two  UBS machine guns were also fitted in the forward fuselage firing above the engine.
Yak-7A improved Yak-7, about 300 built in early 1942
Yak-7B upgraded version of Yak-7A (reduced wingspan, simplified landing gear, better equipment), about 5,000 were built.
Yak-7D long range prototype, development basis for the Yak-7DI/Yak-9.
Yak-7K courier VIP transport version. converted from Yak-7B, 1944.
Yak-7U Mark
Yak-7PVRD experimental - had two DM-4 ramjet under wings, top speed: . Two were built.
Yak-7DI long range fighter, redesignated Yak-9.
Yak-7 M-82  - new (M-82) engine version. tested in 1941.
Yak-7R Jet project with one liquid fuel jet and two ramjets. 1942.
Yak-7R purported jet version of Yak-7 with Jumo 004 engine. Said to have been built in Tbilisi to fly over Red Square at the parade in 1947.
Yak-7R Yak-3 with Jumo 004 turbojet. Development started not later than 1945. First flown in 1946?
Yak-7T two aircraft for testing engine mounted heavy cannons (NS-37 and NS-45  and  calibre respectively).

Operators

 Albanian Air Force 1945 operated 20 Yak-7V two-seat trainer. And 30 Yak-7A improved Yak-7 single-seat fighter enter service. Total 50.

 Free French Air Force operated some in the Normandie-Niemen squadron

 Bulgarian Air Force operated three Yak-7V.

 Hungarian Air Force operated one Yak-7V for familiarization with the Yak-9 fighter.

 Mongolian People's Air Force operated some aircraft as trainers

 The Polish Air Force in Soviet Union operated a few Yak-7Bs for training in the 1st Fighter Regiment "Warszawa". Several Yak-7Vs were used for training and courier duties. Yak-7s were operated by the Polish Air Force between September 1943 till September 23, 1946.

 Soviet Air Force

 SFR Yugoslav Air Force operated two Yak-7V.

Specifications (Yak-7A M-105PA)

See also

References

Notes

Bibliography

 
 Gordon, Yefim and Dmitri Khazanov. Soviet Combat Aircraft of the Second World War, Volume One: Single-Engined Fighters. Earl Shilton, Leicester, UK: Midland Publishing Ltd., 1998. .
 Green, William. Warplanes of the Second World War, Volume Three: Fighters. London: Macdonald & Co. (Publishers) Ltd., 1961 (seventh impression 1973). .
 Green, William and Gordon Swanborough. WW2 Aircraft Fact Files: Soviet Air Force Fighters, Part 2. London: Macdonald and Jane's Publishers Ltd., 1978. .
 Kopenhagen, W., ed. Das große Flugzeug-Typenbuch. Stuggart, Germany: Transpress, 1987. .
 Leonard, Herbert. Encyclopaedia of Soviet Fighters 1939-1951. Paris: Histoire & Collections, 2005. .
 Liss, Witold. The Yak 9 Series (Aircraft in Profile number 185). Leatherhead, Surrey, UK: Profile Publications Ltd., 1967.
 Mellinger, George. Yakovlev Aces of World War 2. Botley, UK: Osprey Publishing Ltd., 2005. .
 Morgan, Hugh. Soviet Aces of World War 2. London: Reed International Books Ltd., 1997. .
 Шавров В.Б. История конструкций самолетов в СССР 1938-1950 гг. (3 изд.). Kniga: Машиностроение, 1994(Shavrov, V.B. Istoriia konstruktskii samoletov v SSSR, 1938-1950 gg., 3rd ed. (History of Aircraft Design in USSR: 1938-1950). Kniga, Russia: Mashinostroenie, 1994. .
 Stapfer, Hans-Heiri. Yak Fighters in Action (Aircraft number 78). Carrollton, Texas: Squadron/Signal Publications, Inc., 1986. .
 Taylor, Michael J.H. Fighters and Bombers of World War II in Colour. London: Bison Books, 1985. .
 Winchester, Jim. "Yak Fighters." Fighters: The World's Finest Combat Aircraft- 1914 to the Present Day. Bath, UK: Parragon Publishing, 2003. .

External links

 Yakovlev Yak-7 description on aviation.ru
 Yakovlev fighters

Low-wing aircraft
1940s Soviet military trainer aircraft
World War II Soviet fighter aircraft
Yak-007
Single-engined tractor aircraft
Aircraft first flown in 1940